Rytigynia longipedicellata is a species of plant in the family Rubiaceae. It is endemic to Tanzania.  It is threatened by habitat loss.

Sources 

Endemic flora of Tanzania
Vanguerieae
Endangered plants
Taxonomy articles created by Polbot